Route 241 is a north/south provincial highway on the south shore of the Saint Lawrence River in Quebec. Its northern terminus is in Roxton Falls at the junction of Route 139 and its southern terminus is close to Cowansville, at the junction of Route 139 once again. The highway overlaps both Route 112 and Route 243 in Waterloo located east of Granby and Bromont and just north of Autoroute 10.

Municipalities along Route 241
 Cowansville
 Bromont
 Waterloo
 Warden
 Saint-Joachim-de-Shefford
 Roxton Falls

See also
 List of Quebec provincial highways

References

External links 
 Route 241 on Google Maps
 Provincial Route Map (Courtesy of the Quebec Ministry of Transportation) 

241